Okuda Genso (奥田元宋) (6 July 1912 – 15 February 2003) was one of the most famous Nihonga painters of the Showa era. He gave his name to a red pigment "Genso red".

Biography 
Okuda was born in Hiroshima prefecture, in what is now Miyoshi City. His original name used the characters 厳三.

Timeline

Famous works
Matsushima Twilight 松島暮色, 1 panel, 77.6 x 167.1 cm (1976)
 
 Lakeshore Spring Glittering 湖畔春耀, 1 panel, 89.0 x 105.6 cm (1986)

References 

1912 births
2003 deaths
Nihonga painters
Artists from Hiroshima Prefecture
20th-century Japanese painters